Dimitar Dimitrov (born 27 January 1966) is a Bulgarian bobsledder. He competed in the two man and the four man events at the 1992 Winter Olympics.

References

1966 births
Living people
Bulgarian male bobsledders
Olympic bobsledders of Bulgaria
Bobsledders at the 1992 Winter Olympics
Place of birth missing (living people)